Danny William Watkins (born November 6, 1984) is a former American football offensive guard in the National Football League (NFL). He was drafted fourth overall by the BC Lions of the Canadian Football League in the 2010 CFL Draft, but played out his last year at Baylor University, the 2010 season. He is currently a fireman for the Frisco Fire Department.

Early years
Watkins' father, Todd, is a road grader. In high school, Watkins played rugby and hockey as a defenseman, but became the "designated goon" because of his size. He became a junior firefighter when he was 16 after visiting the West Kelowna Fire and Rescue squad.

College career

Butte College
Watkins enrolled at Butte College to study fire sciences in order to become a firefighter after a year as a junior firefighter. The school's football coach recruited him to play for their football team, at the age of 22 it was the first time Watkins had ever played football. He played football at Butte from 2007−2008, helping them to a perfect 11−0 record in 2008. Butte coaches sent game tape of his to Division I-A schools, and California, Hawaii, and Baylor were the schools interested.

Baylor University
Watkins transferred to Baylor University, after head coach Art Briles was impressed with his game tape at Butte. Watkins started at left offensive tackle as a junior in 2009 for the Bears. He replaced Jason Smith, who was drafted second overall by the St. Louis Rams in the 2009 NFL Draft.

Professional career

CFL Draft
Watkins was selected with the fourth overall pick in the 2010 CFL Draft by the BC Lions.

NFL Draft
Prior to the 2011 NFL Draft, Watkins was projected to be drafted in the first or second round. He hired former NFL offensive lineman Joe Panos as his agent.

Watkins invited five of his friends from the West Kelowna fire department to join him at the draft. On the morning of the draft, Watkins and his firefighter friends visited  a New York City firehouse that lost several members during the September 11 attacks.

Philadelphia Eagles
Watkins was selected with the 23rd overall pick by the Philadelphia Eagles in the 2011 NFL Draft. He became the oldest first-round selection since 1971 at the age of 26. He was the first Canadian to be drafted in the first rounds of both the CFL and NFL drafts since Mike Schad in 1986. He was projected to start as a rookie at right offensive guard and signed a four-year contract worth $7.9 million on August 1. However, the Eagles claimed Kyle DeVan off waivers from the Indianapolis Colts before the start of the season and Watkins was benched. Watkins was inactive for the first two weeks of the season and was active for a week three game against the New York Giants, but did not play. He was inactive again in week four, but was promoted to the starting right guard on October 5, due to the ineffectiveness of DeVan through the first four games of the season. Watkins was released on August 31, 2013. Eagles general manager Howie Roseman said the "innate toughness" Watkins showed at Baylor never materialized.

Miami Dolphins
The Miami Dolphins signed Watkins to a one-year contract on September 3, 2013 after waiving backup lineman Josh Samuda.

Retirement
In 2014, it was reported that Watkins had left the NFL and was a firefighter in Frisco, Texas.

References

Further reading

External links

Philadelphia Eagles bio
Baylor Bears football bio

1984 births
American football offensive tackles
American football offensive guards
Butte Roadrunners football players
Baylor Bears football players
Canadian players of American football
Living people
Miami Dolphins players
Philadelphia Eagles players
Sportspeople from Kelowna